Guy Fawkes is a 1923 British silent historical film directed by Maurice Elvey and starring Matheson Lang, Nina Vanna and Hugh Buckler. The film depicts the Gunpowder Plot of 1605 in which a group of plotters planned to blow up the Houses of Parliament. It was based on the 1840 novel Guy Fawkes by Harrison Ainsworth.

Cast
 Matheson Lang ...  Guy Fawkes 
 Nina Vanna ...  Viviana Ratcliffe 
 Hugh Buckler ...  Robert Catesby
 Shayle Gardner ...  Humphrey 
 Lionel d'Aragon ...  Earl of Salisbury 
 Edward O'Neill ...  Father 
 Jerrold Robertshaw ...  James I of England 
 Robert English ...  Radcliffe 
 Dallas Cairns ...  Mounteagle 
 Pino Conti ...  Tresham

References

External links

1923 films
1920s historical films
British historical films
British silent feature films
Films set in the 1600s
1920s English-language films
Films directed by Maurice Elvey
Films set in London
British films based on actual events
Films based on British novels
Stoll Pictures films
Cultural depictions of Guy Fawkes
Cultural depictions of James VI and I
British black-and-white films
1920s British films